The 28 cm SK L/40 was a German naval gun that was used in World War I and World War II as the main armament of the - and  pre-dreadnoughts.

Naval guns 

It used Krupp's horizontal sliding-block, or "wedge", as it is sometimes referred to, breech design rather than the interrupted screw commonly used in heavy guns of other nations. This required that the propellant charge be loaded in a metal case (usually brass) which provides obturation, or sealing of the breech, to prevent escape of the expanding propellant gas. The 28 cm SK L/40 was the last large German naval gun to load all its propellant in a single case; later guns required a fore charge in addition to the main charge in the cartridge case.

The Drh.L. C/01 turret was used by the Braunschweig- and Deutschland-class battleships, one twin gun turret at each end. Its guns could depress 4° and elevate 30° and could traverse about 150° on either side of the centerline. These ships stowed 85 rounds per gun. The rate of fire for both types of turrets was about 2 rounds per minute.

The former fired the first shots of World War II when she began bombarding Polish defenses on the Westerplatte on 1 September 1939 while the latter also participated in the Polish Campaign. However both ships were relegated to training duties shortly afterwards.

Coast defense guns 

Some of the 28 cm SK L/40 guns were transferred to the German Army from the Navy (Kaiserliche Marine) when the pre-dreadnoughts began to be disarmed and relegated to training duties in 1916 after the Battle of Jutland had proved that they were not suitable for contemporary naval combat.  One obvious change made for land service was the placement of a large counterweight just forward of the trunnions to counteract the preponderance of weight towards the breech. This, although heavy, was simpler than adding equilibrators to perform the same function. It was fitted with a hydro-pneumatic system to absorb the recoil from firing and to return the gun to its firing position, ready for the next round. The first four guns were placed in Bettungsschiessgerüst (firing platform) (BSG) mountings in 1917 for coast defense duties as part of "Batterie Graf Spee" on the island of Wangerooge. These were a semi-portable mount that could be emplaced anywhere after several weeks of labor to prepare the position. It rotated on a pivot at the front of the mount and the rear was supported by rollers resting on a semicircular rail and was sometimes equipped with a gun shield. The gun's rate of fire in these mounts was about one round per five minutes.

During World War II only seven guns were used as coast defense duties on BSG mountings. The four guns of "Batterie Graf Spee" had survived World War I and were transferred to Brest, France in 1940.

Railway guns 

Approximately twenty other guns from the battleships were put on railroad mountings as the 28 cm SK L/40 "Bruno" and used as railway guns. A number were kept by the Kaiserliche Marine and used on coastal defense duties, but the others were used by the Heer in more traditional roles as long-range heavy artillery. Surviving weapons were used by the Germans in World War II as coast defense duties.

Ammunition 
In World War II, it was replaced by RP C/38 that substituted diethylene glycol dinitrite for the nitroglycerine which had a calorific value of 810 and an uncooled explosion temperature of 2495 K. This had the virtue of being harder to ignite, lessening the risk of a catastrophic fire or explosion, and reduced the erosive effects of the gaseous propellant on the gun's bore. Sources differ on the amount of RP C/38 used by the gun during World War II; Campbell says , but Hogg says .

These guns mounted fired two types of shells during World War I: armor-piercing (AP) L/2.6 and high explosive (HE) L/2.9 types.

Due to the greater elevation available in the BSG mount, the Sprgr L/4.4 m. Bdz. u. Kz.

Armor penetration 

See also 
 List of naval guns

Footnotes

Notes

Citations

References 
 
 
 
 
  }

External links 

 SK L/40 at NavWeaps.com

280 mm artillery
Naval guns of Germany
Coastal artillery